Saúl Torres Rojas (born 20 March 1990) is a Bolivian professional footballer who plays for The Strongest as a right back.

On 3 March 2019 Torres made his debut for the Bolivia national football team against Nicaragua.

References

External links

1990 births
Living people
Bolivian footballers
Association football defenders
Bolivian Primera División players
Universitario de Sucre footballers
Club Real Potosí players
Nacional Potosí players
The Strongest players
Bolivia international footballers
People from Sucre